The 104th Guards Airborne Division was a division of the Soviet Airborne Troops during the Cold War that briefly became part of the Russian Airborne Forces after the dissolution of the Soviet Union. It was originally formed as the 11th Guards Airborne Division during World War II. In December 1944, the 11th Guards Airborne Division became the 104th Guards Rifle Division. On 7 June 1946, the division was renamed the 104th Guards Airborne Division. It was reduced to the 31st Guards Airborne Brigade in May 1998.

History 
The 11th Guards Airborne Division was formed on 23 December 1943 from three Guards Airborne Brigades in the Moscow Military District. It was part of the 38th Guards Airborne Corps. On 8 December 1944, it became the 104th Guards Rifle Division, part of the 9th Guards Army. In March 1945, the division was deployed to the Budapest area. In fighting from 16 to 22 March, the division inflicted heavy losses on German troops. During the final stage of the Vienna Offensive, the division captured Sankt Pölten, thus closing off routes into Vienna. On 26 April, the division was awarded the Order of Kutuzov 2nd class. On 12 May, the division reached the Vltava, meeting American troops.

On 7 June 1946, the division became the 104th Guards Airborne Division in Narva. It relocated to Ostrov in Pskov Oblast, becoming part of the 15th Guards Airborne Corps. In 1960, the division was relocated to the Transcaucasian Military District and was based in Kirovabad (now Gyandzha), in the Azerbaijani SSR. Elements were also based in Shamkhor, Baku, and Kutaisi.

Bases:
 Narva, Estonian SSR, June 1946 – April 1947
 Ostrov, Pskov Oblast, April 1947 – June 1960
 Gyandzha (Kirovabad), Azerbaijan SSR, June 1960 – August 1992 [40 43 09N, 46 23 07E]
 Ulyanovsk, Ulyanovsk Oblast, August 1992 – May 1998. [54 21 16N, 48 34 50E]

Most of the division's personnel fought in the Soviet–Afghan War. The division was located in Kirovabad during the events of the Kirovabad pogrom, in which Soviet Army forces were used to restore order. According to CFE Treaty data, on 11 November 1990, the division was equipped with 219 BMD-1 and 93 BMD-2 airborne infantry fighting vehicles, 107 BTR-D armoured personnel carriers, 72 2S9 Nona self-propelled guns, 36 BTR-RD anti-tank missile carriers, 42 BTR-ZD self-propelled anti-aircraft guns, and 6 D-30 howitzers. In 1993, the division was relocated to Ulyanovsk. From 1994 to 1996, the 104th Guards Airborne fought in the First Chechen War.

Due to a reorganization of the Russian Airborne Forces spurred by reductions in personnel strength, the division was reduced to the 31st Guards Airborne Brigade, which inherited its colors, awards, and lineage, on 1 May 1998.

In June 2015, it was announced that the 31st Guards Airborne Brigade would be upgraded to the 104th Guards Airborne Division. The new division would include three regiments at Ulyanovsk, Orenburg and Engels. Reactivation of the division from the brigade was previously announced earlier but did not eventuate. At the June 2019 Army-2019 forum, Chairman of the Defence Committee of the State Duma Vladimir Shamanov reiterated that the division would eventually be reformed, but stated that no final decision had been made on the timing.

Composition

104th Guards Rifle Division 
The 104th Guards Rifle Division included the following units.
 328th Guards Rifle Regiment
 332nd Guards Rifle Regiment
 346th Guards Rifle Regiment

104th Guards Airborne Division 
The 104th Guards Airborne Division included the following units in 1947.
 328th Guards Airborne Regiment
 346th Guards Air-landing Regiment
 82nd Guards Artillery Regiment
On 1 October 1948, the 346th Guards Air-landing Regiment was used to create the 21st Guards Airborne Division, and was replaced by the 337th Guards Air-landing Regiment.

Commanders 
The following officers commanded the 11th Guards Airborne Division, 104th Guards Rifle Division, and 104th Guards Airborne Division:

 Major general Vasily Ivanovich Ivanov (1943–1944);
 Major general Alexey Redchenko (21 February – 26 March 1945);
 Major general Ivan Fedotovich Seryogin (27 March – 5 November 1945);
 Major general Nikolai Tavartkiladze (1945–1950);
 Lieutenant colonel Alexander Startsev (1950);
 Colonel Pyotr Khvorostenko (1950–1954);
 Major general Alexei Rudakov (1954–1955);
 Major general Fyodor Dranishchev (1955–1961);
 Colonel Ivan Sineoky (1961–1963);
 Colonel Yuri Potapov (1963–1964);
 Major general Nikolai Guskov (1964–1967);
 Major general Anatoly Spirin (1968–1975);
 Major general Alexander Khomenko (1975–1981);
 Major general Nikolai Serdyukov (1981–1984);
 Major general Evgeny Semyonov (1984–1987);
 Major general Viktor Sorokin (1987–1989);
 Major general Valery Shcherbak (1990–1993);
 Major general Vadim Orlov (1993–1998).

References

Citations

Bibliography 

Airborne divisions of the Soviet Union
Airborne divisions of Russia
Military units and formations established in 1946
Military units and formations disestablished in 1998
Army divisions of the Soviet Union